Road to Eilat (Egyptian Arabic: الطريق إلى إيلات translit: Al-Tareek Ela Eilat or El Tareeq Ela Eilat aliases: The Road to Eilat) is a 1994 Egyptian war film directed by Inaam Mohammed Ali and features Salah Zulfikar in a special appearance as Admiral Fouad Abu Zikry the commander of Egyptian Navy. It stars Ezzat El Alaili and Nabil Al-Halfawi. The film is Salah Zulfikar’s final film role.

Plot 
The film takes place during the War of Attrition in 1969, before the October War, specifically in July. The film deals with the Egyptian raids on the Israeli port of Eilat, operations carried out by a group of frogmen belonging to the Egyptian Navy, when they attacked the Eilat War Port and were able to destroy two warships: Beit Sheva, Bat Yam and the war pier (the two ships were attacking the Egyptian positions in the Red Sea after the Israeli forces took over the Sinai), then the return of these frogs safely after completing their mission successfully, after the martyrdom of one hero.

Cast 

 Salah Zulfikar - Admiral Fouad Abou Zikry, Commander of the Egyptian Navy
 Ezzat El Alaili - Colonel Radi, commander of the operation
 Nabil Al-Halfawi - Colonel Mahmoud, the training commander
 Mohamed El-Dafrawi - Chief of Staff of the Egyptian Navy
 Mohamed Abdel-Gawad - Captain Hatim
 Hisham Abdullah - Staff Sergeant Navy Alish
 Nasir Saif - Rear naval lieutenant
 Abdullah Mahmoud - Martyr Marine Sergeant Morsi Al-Zanati
 Hani Kamal - Lieutenant Marine Hussain
 Mohamed Saad - Sergeant Qenawyi
 Alaa Morsi - Samir, boat maintenance engineer
 Tariq Al-Nahry - Jalal - The Auxiliary Group
 Farouk Aita - Fawaz - The Supporting Group
 Suleiman Eid - Salem, desert guide
 Madeleine Tabar - Maryam, one of the guides
 Medhat Morsi - Director of Egyptian Military Intelligence
 Yousry Mustafa - Operation Officer in Jordan
 Amin Hashem Responsible for Egyptian Radio
 Sherine Wagdy - the wife of Captain Mahmoud
 Nahed Rushdie - the wife of Captain Radi
 Alan Zoghby: Israeli officer
 Muhammad Mahmoud: Abu Jihad: a Palestinian fighter
 Tariq Al-Amir - Ibrahim Balousha - Muhammad Ammar - Youssef Hussein - Muhammad Safwat - Tawheed Majdi - Majdi Suleiman

Military Experts 
 Retired Major General Ibrahim Dakhakhni
 Retired Admiral Mustafa Taher

From the Navy 
 Rear Admiral: Farouk Mohsab
 Commodore: Nabawi Shalaby
 Admiral: Abdel Azim Tawash
 Naval Colonel: Mustafa Abdel-Raouf Al-Haw
 Marine Major: Ashraf Mohamed
 Naval Captain: Mohamed Sharif - Military Training Supervisor

Film crew 
 Screenplay: Fayez Ghaly
 Directed by: Inaam Muhammad Ali
 Produced by: Production Sector Egyptian Television
 Producer: Mamdouh El-Leithy
 Producers: Muhammad Khamis - Imad Al-Sheikh - Muhammad Tawfiq - Ali Mahmoud - Ahmed Hamid
 Music score: Yasser Abdel Rahman
 Palestinian dialect references: Majeh Badrakhan
 Hebrew dialect references: Tawheed Majdi
 Makeup: Ramadan Imam - Imam Ramadan - Muhammad Ramadan
 Hairdresser: Mamdouh Omar
 Clothes: Ahmed Salem
 Accessory: Amin Mostafa
 Executors of the decor: Muhammad Al-Boushi - Muhammad Zaki - Sayed Amin - Ahmed Othman - Sharif Al-Salami - Abdel Hamid Abdel Fattah - Tariq Al-Boushi - Ibrahim Harb - Mohamed Abdel-Alim- Ahmed Abdel-Gawad - Salah Abu Al-Majd - Hassan Ali Hassan - Saad Ali Esawy - Muhammad  Tammam Al-Bushy - Mahmoud Hassan - Mohamed Abdel-Sabour
 Voice recorder: Adeeb Fouad - Ahmed Abdel Khaleq
 Assistant Mixing: Hiam Mohamed
 Photography: Sobhi Basta
 Clacket: Ibrahim Bayoumi
 Registrar: Mohsen Abdelazim

See also 
 Salah Zulfikar filmography
 List of Egyptian films of 1994
 List of Egyptian films of the 1990s

References

External links 
 Road to Eilat on elCinema
 

1994 films
Films shot in Egypt
Egyptian war films
1990s Arabic-language films
1990s war films